Cenate is a village in Apulia, southern Italy, a frazione of the municipality of Nardò.

Main sights

It is famous for its noble villas (c. twenty in number) built from the 15th to the early 20th centuries. The most notable are the Villa del Vescovo, the summer residence of the Bishop of Nardò and the Villa Taverna, the most ancient one.

See also
Santa Maria al Bagno

References

Nardò
Frazioni of the Province of Lecce
Localities of Salento